VIVA Schweiz was a TV channel which timeshared with Nickelodeon Switzerland and featured music videos and quizzes. It launched on 6 September 2000. The channel served German-speaking regions in Switzerland. It closed on 31 December 2018, along with all other Viva-branded channels.

Timesharing with Comedy Central
From 8 September 2014 VIVA aired between 6 am and 5 pm, with Comedy Central Switzerland taking up evening and late night. Until October 2014 there was a simulcast broadcast of the program of Comedy Central on the shared frequency with Nickelodeon (9 pm to 5.30 am) and on the VIVA-frequency (5 pm to 6 am).

 Programmes:
 Clip Trip
 VIVA News
 Nacht Express
 Charts Rotation

Presenters
Among the presenters was Noémi Besedes.

References

VIVA (TV station)
Television stations in Switzerland
Television channels and stations established in 2000
Television channels and stations disestablished in 2018